Mortal Way of Live is a live album by German thrash metal band Sodom, released in 1988. The original cover was censored for the CD release of the record, it was replaced with an all black cover with a white circle in the center containing the band's logo and name of the record, with the original cover appearing on the back of the booklet.

Track listing

Personnel
 Tom Angelripper  - vocals, bass
 Frank Blackfire - guitars
 Chris Witchhunter - drums

References

1988 live albums
Sodom (band) live albums
1988 video albums
Live video albums
Sodom (band) video albums
SPV/Steamhammer live albums
SPV/Steamhammer video albums